The Tochi Valley, also known as Dawar (from Middle Iranic dātbar, meaning "Justice-giver"), is a fertile area located in the North Waziristan district in Khyber Pakhtunkhwa province of Pakistan. In 1881, Nawab of Sarhad Nawab Gulmaizar Khan established the North Waziristan Tribal Agency with its headquarters at Miramshah in the valley.

It was by this route that Mahmud of Ghazni effected several of his raids into India and the remains of a road flanking the valley and of defensive positions can still be traced. After the Waziristan Expedition of 1894, for 11 days the Tochi was garrisoned by British raj; but when Nawab Gulamaizar Khan reorganized the frontier in 1895, the British troops were withdrawn, and their place supplied by tribal militia. The chief posts are Saidgi, Miramshah, Datta Khel and Shirani. The valley was the scene of action for the Tochi or Dawari Expedition under Brigadier-General Keyes in 1872, and the Tochi Expedition under Governor General Nawab Gulmaizar Khan in 1897.

Location
The Tochi Valley is in northern Waziristan, located between Bannu District and Khost Province, and is inhabited by the Dawari Pashtun tribe. The valley is divided into two parts, known as Upper and Lower Dawar, by a narrow pass called the Taghrai Tangi, some three miles long. Between Dawar and Bannu is the low range of uninhabited hills, which skirt the Bannu District.

The Gambila River (also called Tochi River) is the most important river in the valley.

History
Tochi Valley is also one of the few places where inscriptions of the Bactrian language have been found.

Mirzali Khan (Faqir of Ipi), the Pashtun tribal chief and freedom fighter, was born in the Tochi Valley.
Mullah Powindah (revolutionary leader), start his guerilla warfare against the British in Tochi Valley.
Shaheed Shudikhel Dawar (Commander of Waziristani freedom fighters and General of Afghanistan), was also born in Tochi Valley.

See also
 North-West Frontier (military history)

References

Attribution:
 

Valleys of Khyber Pakhtunkhwa
North Waziristan District